The 1979 NCAA Division I baseball tournament was played at the end of the 1979 NCAA Division I baseball season to determine the national champion of college baseball.  The tournament concluded with eight teams competing in the College World Series, a double-elimination tournament in its thirty third year.  Eight regional competitions were held to determine the participants in the final event.  Seven regions held a four team, double-elimination tournament while one region included six teams, resulting in 34 teams participating in the tournament at the conclusion of their regular season, and in some cases, after a conference tournament.  The thirty-third tournament's champion was Cal State Fullerton, coached by Augie Garrido.  The Most Outstanding Player was Tony Hudson of Cal State Fullerton.

Regionals
Seven of the eight regionals were played as 4-team double-elimination tournaments. One regional was played as a 6-team double-elimination tournament. The winner of each regional moved on to the College World Series.

Northeast Regional
Games played at Annapolis, Maryland.

Atlantic Regional
Games played at Coral Gables, Florida.

Mideast Regional
Games played at East Lansing, Michigan.

East Regional
Games played at Tallahassee, Florida

Midwest Regional
Games played at Tucson, Arizona.

Central Regional
Games played at Austin, Texas.

South Regional
Games played at Starkville, Mississippi.

West Regional
Games played at Fresno, California.

College World Series
Connecticut, Miami (FL), Pepperdine, Arkansas, Arizona, Texas, Mississippi St., and Cal St. Fullerton won their regionals and moved on to the College World Series.

Participants

Results

Bracket

Game results

All-Tournament Team
The following players were members of the All-Tournament Team.

Notable players
 Arizona: Terry Francona, Craig Lefferts, Brad Mills, John Moses, Jim Scranton, Dwight Taylor
 Arkansas: Kevin McReynolds, Johnny Ray, Ronn Reynolds
 Cal State Fullerton: John Christensen, Andre David, Tim Wallach
 Connecticut: 
 Miami (FL): Tony Brewer, Neal Heaton, Ross Jones, Mike Pagliarulo, Dennis Owens
 Mississippi State: Tim Weisheim
 Pepperdine: Mike Gates
 Texas: Jim Acker, Tony Arnold,  Joseph Bruno, Keith Creel, Ron Gardenhire, Jerry Don Gleaton, Andre Robertson, Ricky Wright

Tournament notes 

 In the South Regional semifinal Murray State and New Orleans set a tournament record for most combined runs in a game (31).

See also
 1979 NCAA Division II baseball tournament
 1979 NCAA Division III baseball tournament
 1979 NAIA World Series

References

NCAA Division I Baseball Championship
Tournament
NCAA Division I Baseball
Baseball in Austin, Texas